Corazón Partido (Broken Heart), is a Spanish-language telenovela produced by the United States-based television network Telemundo and Argos Comunicacion. This limited-run series ran for 90 episodes from November 1, 2005 to June 16, 2006. This telenovela was aired in 17 countries around the world.

Story 
"Corazón Partido" tells the story of a young woman that returns to her country in search of the son that was tragically taken from her arms at birth. Out of the 25 million people that inhabit the city, she will meet a married man and fall desperately in love with him, without knowing that he is the adoptive father of her lost child.

Cast 

Danna García - Aura Echarri Medina
José Ángel Llamas - Adrian Rincon / Santiago Rincon
Saby Kamalich - Virginia Graham
Carlos Torres Torrija - César Echarri #1
Julio Bracho Castillo - César Echarri #2
Ximena Rubio - Nelly Zambrano
Anna Ciocchetti - Fernanda Medina
Khotan Fernández - Sergio Garza
Alejandro Cava - Ramón Cadena 'El Tanque'
Alejandra Lazcano - Claudia
Angeles Marin - Ernestina de Zambrano
Carlos de la Mota - German Garza
Enrique Singer - Rogelio Garza
Evangelina Martinez - Consuelo 'Chelo' Delgado
Giovan Ramos - Nelson Córdoba
Gizeth Galatea - Rocio
Juan Carlos Barreto - Erasmo
Juan Luis Orendain - Gregorio Medina Arce
Karina Mora - Alejandra Garza
Luis Gerardo Mendez - Ignacio 'Nacho' Echarri
Paco Mauri - Amador Zambrano
Patricia Marrero - Filomena Bolado
Sergio Adriano Ortiz Garda - Esteban Rincon Zambrano
Alejandro Felipe - Piquin
Toni Helling - Betina
Eréndira Dávalos - Rosa
Mario Loría - Hilberto

References

External links
 
 

2005 telenovelas
2006 telenovelas
2005 American television series debuts
2006 American television series endings
2005 Mexican television series debuts
2006 Mexican television series endings
2005 Chilean television series debuts
2006 Chilean television series endings
Mexican telenovelas
Argos Comunicación telenovelas
Telemundo telenovelas
Television series by Universal Television